The Museu Nacional do Traje e da Moda is located in Monteiro-Mor Palace, in Lisbon, Portugal. It has a collection of more than 33,000 items, which includes mainly masculine and feminine costumes from the 18th and 19th centuries.

References

External links
 Museum website
The National Museum of Costume on Google Arts & Culture

Museums in Lisbon
National museums of Portugal
Costume museums